is a Japanese role-playing video game developed by Cygames. On 21st August, 2016 it was announced at the Cygames NEXT 2016 new game presentation. It was released in Japan on February 15, 2018 for Android and iOS, and on May 22, 2018 for Microsoft Windows via DMM Games. Mobile version would later be released in other regions. The game was announced in August 2016 as a sequel to the social network game Princess Connect! (Japanese: プリンセスコネクト！, abbreviated as プリコネ, Prikone), which was released on February 18, 2015 and ended service in June 2016. The game was co-developed by CyberAgent and Ameba Business Division (Girl Friend Beta) and Cygames (Rage of Bahamut and Granblue Fantasy), by utilizing the strengths of both companies. It is a dating sim game that incorporates online RPG elements such as guild battles.

Princess Connect! - Princess Knight Sodatsusen (Japanese: プリンセスコネクト！ 〜プリンセスナイト争奪戦〜) was a web novel of the prequel game Princess Connect! was released on Dengeki Online. Author by Ōta Riyō with the supervision of and co-produced by CyberAgent / Cygames.

An anime television series adaptation produced by CygamesPictures aired from April to June 2020. A second season aired from January to March 2022.

Development 
As Cygames was in charge of Princess Connect! Character productions and the project started with the desire to make a sequel using these characters after obtaining permission. Since there was time during the update for the final story of Princess Connect!, it was decided to make Pecorine the lead role in the sequel Princess Connect! Re:Dive and to make an appearance in the ending of Princess Connect!.

It was developed as an anime RPG that consists of two parts animation and game. Care was taken not to separate these two elements during the UI design and visuals adjustments. The main story animations are produced by WIT STUDIO. While the ending of the limited-time event and others are produced by CygamesPictures.

Story

After the events of Princess Connect!, the Twinkle Wish guild would ascend the Tower of Sol where they reach the very top and encounter Mana Senri who merged with Minerva. After wiping out Hiyori and Rei, Yuuki is severely injured and shields Yui from an attack before he is engulfed by Mana's attack. Yuuki awakens in an unknown location and meets Ameth, who seems to be familiar with him. With no time, she sends him down to Landsol where he is given a vague mission that he must do.

Upon awakening, Yuuki has lost all memory. He is met by Kokkoro, a girl assigned by Ameth to be his guide on his adventures. Shortly afterwards he meets a swordswoman with a voracious appetite, whom the duo nickname Pecorine, and later a cat-beast race girl Karyl. The group founds the guild Gourmet Edifice with the goal of going on adventures while eating the food that Landsol has to offer. As for Yuuki, he is determined to recover his memories and complete the mission Ameth has in store for him.

Gameplay
Princess Connect! Re:Dive is a real-time action role-playing game. Players can form a party of up to five characters to participate in various modes such as main quests and player versus player (PvP) arena modes. New characters can be obtained via a gacha mechanic or can be exchanged with character-specific Memory Pieces (the latter is not possible for event-exclusive characters). Players are also able to form clans to qualify for participation in Clan Battles, which are similar to raid battles in a typical massively multiplayer online role-playing game, or freely chat with one another using text or in-game emojis in the clan room.

Every playable character in the game has a regular attack, two Skills, an EX Skill, and one Union Burst. Players generally have no control over the activation of characters' skills and attacks, which are automatically activated at predetermined times based on character. EX Skills are stat-gaining skills that are activated on the start of each battle. A Union Burst is a powerful skill which, unlike other skills, can be manually activated by the player at any time the character's Union Burst Meter (also known as TP in-game) is full. However, all PvP arena modes are strictly on autoplay, where the character's Union Burst is activated as soon as their TP is fully charged.

Albums 

Absolute Secret

 Vocals: Karyl (CV: Rika Tachibana)
 Composer: Naozumi Mabuchi
 Arranger: Naozumi Mabuchi
 Lyricist: corochi (Cygames)
Ending theme for chapter 8

Media

Manga
A manga adaptation, written by Asahiro Kakashi and illustrated by wEshica/Shōgo, has been serialized online via Cygames' manga app Cycomics. Kodansha have published two tankōbon volumes as of February 2019. A comic anthology featuring various artists was released on May 27, 2019.

Anime

An anime television series adaptation by CygamesPictures aired from April 7 to June 30, 2020. The series premiered in Japan on Tokyo MX, BS11, Sun TV, and KBS Kyoto before airing on other channels. It was also simulcast in North America by Crunchyroll. The series was directed by Takaomi Kanasaki with assistant directing by Kana Harufuji. Satomi Kurita, Lie Jun Yang and Yasuyuki Noda provided character designs.

On August 13, 2020, it was announced that the series will receive a second season, with CygamesPictures returning for production. It is directed by Yasuo Iwamoto, with Kanasaki serving as the chief director and scriptwriter. Mai Watanabe joins Kurita, Yang, and Noda to provide character designs, and Imagine is composing the series' music. The main cast will reprise their roles. The second season aired from January 11 to March 29, 2022.

Video games

PriConne: Grand Masters 
Was available from 1st to 8th April 2022 as an April Fools' limited Auto Chess type game.

Granblue Fantasy 
Several Princess Connect! Re:Dive characters featured in a collaboration event for the role-playing game Granblue Fantasy between December 9 and December 21, 2018. Pecorine and Kokkoro are both playable characters while Kyaru and the player character appear in the story. The event was reintroduced permanently in 2019 with Kyaru also being made playable.

Dragalia Lost 
In November 5, 2020, it was announced that Pecorine would be featured in a collaboration event for Dragalia Lost.

Notes

References

External links
  
  
 

2018 video games
2020 anime television series debuts
2022 anime television series debuts
Ameba (website)
Android (operating system) games
Anime television series based on video games
Crunchyroll anime
Cygames franchises
DMM Games games
Fantasy video games
Fictional princesses
Free-to-play video games
Gacha games
IOS games
Japanese role-playing video games
Japanese webcomics
Kodansha manga
Manga based on video games
Monarchy in fiction
Tokyo MX original programming
Video games developed in Japan
Video games featuring female protagonists
Video games scored by Yasunori Nishiki
Webcomics in print
Windows games
Kakao Games games